The Little Tahltan River is a stream in the Northern Interior of British Columbia, Canada.

References

External links

Rivers of British Columbia
Cassiar Land District
Level Mountain
Nahlin Plateau